The Police Museum (Polismuseet) is a policing museum in Stockholm, Sweden, run by and telling the history of the Swedish Police. It has existed in its present form since 2007.

References

External link

2007 establishments in Europe
Museums in Stockholm
Law enforcement museums in Europe
Law enforcement in Sweden